The 1926–27 Kansas Jayhawks men's basketball team represented the University of Kansas during the 1926–27 college men's basketball season.

Roster
Glenn Burton
Gale Gordon
James Hill
Balfour Jeffrey
Leo Lattin
Robert Maney
Carmen Newland
Albert Peterson
Harold Schmidt

Schedule

References

Kansas Jayhawks men's basketball seasons
Kansas
Kansas
Kansas